The Warwickshire Police Authority is the police authority of Warwickshire in England. Created in 1995, it holds the Chief Constable of the Warwickshire Police Force to account and sets the budget for the force.

The Authority has departed from the traditional police authority structure and since 2007 has operated within a governance framework designed to   work more closely with the force. Under the framework, there are three main work streams: Policing communities, Resources and Investigation & strategic planning. Each of these work streams is closely aligned to the main work areas of the police force and gives responsibility to the Authority to govern the way the force carries out its business, but does not have any influence over the operational side of its work, which remains solely with the Chief Constable.

Members of the Police Authority, along with representatives from county, district, borough, town and parish councils and the Police Force annually consult with the public at   33 community forums across Warwickshire.  It   also has accounts on Facebook, Twitter and YouTube.`

In January 2011, it was revealed that the authority was in discussion with the neighbouring West Mercia Police Authority, with a view to having their two police forces enter into a strategic alliance to meet anticipated cuts., though  merging the two services completely was ruled out.

Structure 

The WPA is made up of 17 members: 9 nominated by Warwickshire County Council and 8 independent members directly appointed (at least one of whom is a serving magistrate). 
Since 25 May 2011 the authority's chairman has been Phil Robson, an independent member, who retired in 2001 as Warwickshire’s Chief Probation Officer. The previous chairman was Ian Francis.

The authority also has a representative on the Police Force's 'Executive Board'.

Audit 

The authority's work is reviewed by the Audit Commission, who in 2010 described the Authority as "performing adequately and .. contributing to improved policing in the county".

References

External links 
 
 Twitter account

Police Authority
1995 establishments in England
Police authorities in England
2012 disestablishments in England